The Lynchburg Hillcats are a Minor League Baseball team in Lynchburg, Virginia that plays in the Carolina League and is the Single-A affiliate of the Cleveland Guardians. They were a farm team of the Atlanta Braves from 2011 to 2014, the Cincinnati Reds in 2010, and the Pittsburgh Pirates from 1995 to 2009. The Hillcats play home games at Calvin Falwell Field; refurbished and renamed in 2004, the stadium seats 4,291 fans.

In May 2016, the franchise announced that they would rebrand after the season. When put to a fan vote for a new moniker with "Derechos," "Doves," "Lamb Chops," "Love Apples," and "River Runners" as options, a majority of fans voted to retain the Hillcats name. They did, however, unveil new logos and a different color scheme, consisting of seven hills green, Blue Ridge blue, and midnight blue, for the 2017 season.

Division and league championships
 1896 State League Champions, No playoffs.
 1906 Virginia League Champions, No playoffs.
 1940 Virginia League Champions, Senators over Harrisonburg, 3–2.
 1944 Piedmont League Champions, Cardinals over Portsmouth Cubs, 4–3.
 1948 Piedmont League Regular Season Champions, Cardinals lose to Newport News Dodgers, 0–4.
 1949 Piedmont League Champions, Cardinals over Portsmouth Cubs, 4–2.
 1962 South Atlantic League Regular Season Champions, White Sox lose to Macon, 0–3.
 1963 South Atlantic League 2nd-Half Champions, White Sox lose to Augusta, 2–3.
 1964 Southern League Champions, No playoffs.
 1973 Carolina League 1st-Half Champions, Twins lose to Winston-Salem, 2–3.
 1977 Carolina League 1st-Half Champions, Mets lose to Peninsula, 2–3.
 1978 Carolina League Champions, Mets over Peninsula, 3–0.
 1982 Carolina League 2nd-Half Northern Division Champions, Mets lose to Alexandria in one-game Divisional playoff.
 1983 Carolina League Champions, Mets sweep Northern Division and win over Winston-Salem, 3–0.
 1984 Carolina League Champions, Mets sweep Northern Division and win over Durham, 3–1.
 1985 Carolina League Northern Division Champions, Mets sweep Division lose to Winston-Salem, 1–3.
 1988 Carolina League 2nd-Half Northern Division Champions, Red Sox over Salem, 2–1, in playoffs, lose to Kinston, 2–3, in Championship.
 1989 Carolina League 1st-Half Northern Division Champions, Red Sox lose to Prince William, 1–2, in playoffs.
 1991 Carolina League 2nd-Half Northern Division Champions, Red Sox over Prince William, 2–0, in playoffs, lose to Kinston, 0–3, in Championship.
 1992 Carolina League Northern Division Champions, Red Sox sweep Division lose to Peninsula, 2–3, in Championship.
 1997 Carolina League Champions, Hillcats win 2nd-Half Northern Division, over Frederick, 2–0, in playoffs, over Kinston, 3–1, in Championship.
 2000 Carolina League 2nd-Half Northern Division Champions, Hillcats over Frederick, 2–0, in playoffs, lose to Myrtle Beach, 0–3, in Championship.
 2002 Carolina League Champions, Hillcats win Northern Division Wildcard, over Wilmington, 2–1, in playoffs, over Kinston, 3–1, in Championship.
 2003 Carolina League 1st-Half Northern Division Champions, Hillcats over Wilmington, 2–0, in playoffs, lose to Winston-Salem, 0–3, in Championship.
 2005 Carolina League 1st-Half Northern Division Champions, Hillcats lose to Frederick, 0–2, in playoffs.
 2009 Carolina League Champions, 1st-Half Northern Division Champions, Hillcats over Wilmington, 3–2, in playoffs, over Salem, 3–0, in Championship.
 2012 Carolina League Champions, 1st-Half Northern Division Champions, Hillcats over Wilmington, 2–1, in playoffs, over Winston-Salem, 3–1, in Championship.
 2013 Carolina League 2nd-Half Northern Division Wild Card, Hillcats lose to Potomac, 0–2, in playoffs.
 2014 Carolina League 2nd-Half Northern Division Wild Card, Hillcats lose to Potomac, 0–2, in playoffs.
 2015 Carolina League 2nd-Half Northern Division Champions, Hillcats lose to Wilmington, 2–0, in playoffs.
 2016 Carolina League 1st-Half & 2nd-Half Northern Division Champions, Hillcats over Potomac, 2–1, in playoffs, lose to Myrtle Beach, 3–1, in Championship.
 2017 Carolina League Champions, Hillcats over Frederick in playoffs, 2–1, declared co-champions with Down East as a result of the playoffs being called off because of Hurricane Irma.

Roster

Notable Lynchburg alumni

Baseball Hall of Fame alumni

 Red Schoendienst (1943) Inducted, 1989

Notable alumni

 Eli Morgan (2018)
 Neil Walker, 2005–06
 Nyjer Morgan, 2005–06
 Rajai Davis, 2004
 Henry Owens, 2004
 Zach Duke, 2004
 Paul Maholm, 2004
 José Bautista, 2003
 Nate McLouth, 2000–02
 John Grabow, 2001
 Joe Beimel, 2000
 Bronson Arroyo (1997) MLB All-Star
 Kris Benson (1997)
 Aramis Ramírez, 1997 MLB All-Star
 Jose Guillen (1996)
 Trot Nixon, 1994
 Aaron Sele (1992) 2 x MLB All-Star
 Scott Hatteberg (1991)
 John Valentin (1989)
 Scott Cooper (1988) 2 x MLB All-Star
 Kevin Elster (1985)
 Rick Aguilera (1984) 3 x MLB All-Star
 Dave Magadan (1984)
 Randy Myers (1984) 4 x MLB All-Star
 Lenny Dykstra (1983) 3 x MLB All-Star
 Dwight Gooden (1983, 1987)) 4 x MLB All-Star; 1984 NL Rookie of the Year; 1985 NL CY Young Award
 Roger McDowell (1982)
 Kevin Mitchell (1982) 2 x MLB All-Star; 1989 NL Most Valuable Player
 Lloyd McClendon (1981–82)
 Darryl Strawberry (1981) 8 x MLB All-Star; 1983 NL Rookie of the Year
 Billy Beane (1981)
 Jody Davis (1978) 2 x MLB All-Star
 Greg Harris (1978)
 Jeff Reardon (1977) 4 x MLB All-Star
 Alex Trevino (1976)
 Dave Goltz (1974)
 Al Fitzmorris (1968)
 Carlos May (1968) 2 x MLB All-Star
 Gail Hopkins, 1967
 Andy Etchebarren (1963) 2 x MLB All-Star
 Don Buford (1962) MLB All-Star
 Dave DeBusschere (1962) 8 x NBA All-Star
 Joe Hoerner (1962) MLB All-Star
 J.C. Martin (1962) 
 John McNamara (1952)
 Stan Spence (1951) 4 x MLB All-Star
 Ray Jablonski (1950) MLB All-Star
 Wes Ferrell (1942, 1946) 2 x MLB All-Star
 Al Orth (1909) 1906 AL Wins Leader

 Andrelton Simmons (2011) 4 time gold glove winner
 Tommy La Stella (2016) World Series Champion
 Willi Castro (2016)
 Anthony Santander (2016)
 Bobby Bradley (2016)
 Yu Chang (2016)
 Francisco Mejia (2016)
 Greg Allen (2016)

References

External links
 
 Statistics from Baseball-Reference

Baseball teams established in 1963
Sports in Lynchburg, Virginia
Professional baseball teams in Virginia
Carolina League teams
Cleveland Guardians minor league affiliates
Pittsburgh Pirates minor league affiliates
Cincinnati Reds minor league affiliates
Atlanta Braves minor league affiliates
Boston Red Sox minor league affiliates
New York Mets minor league affiliates
Texas Rangers minor league affiliates
Minnesota Twins minor league affiliates
Chicago White Sox minor league affiliates
1963 establishments in Virginia